Gay Gulch is an iron meteorite found in 1901 by miners near Dawson City, Yukon Territory, using a slice box to mine alluvial gold. They were exploiting Pliocene gravel, hence the meteorite may have fallen at that time.

Classification
It is a nickel-rich ataxite, IAB-sHH.

Fragments
The main mass is in the National Meteorite Collection, Ottawa.

See also
 Glossary of meteoritics
Meteorite find

References

Meteorites found in Canada
1901 in Canada